Durel is a French last name derived from the French adjective dur ("hard", "tough") that – with another etymology – can also be found in Turkey, where it may be derived like the names Duran ("staying"), Durmuş ("stayed") and Dursun ("he may stay") from the Turkish verb durmak ("to stop", "to stand", "to stay", "to remain").

Notable people with the surname include:

 Joey Durel  (born 1953), American businessman and former mayor of Lafayette, Louisiana
 Philippe Durel (born 1954), former French racing cyclist

References

French-language surnames
Turkish-language surnames